Upper Hill is a neighborhood in the city of Springfield, Massachusetts.

Neighborhoods in Springfield, Massachusetts